Hoen is a surname of Dutch or Norwegian origin. A variant form in Dutch is "'t Hoen" ("the hen"). People with this surname include:

August Hoen (1817–1886), American lithographer
Borger Kristoffersson Hoen (1799–1877), Norwegian politician
Christopher Borgersen Hoen (1767–1845), Norwegian farmer and politician
Cornelis Hoen (c.1440–1524), Dutch theologian
Guno Hoen (1922–2010), Surinamese footballer, commentator and author
Herman Hoen (1340–1404), first lord of Hoensbroek, son of Nicolaes
Nicolaes Hoen (died 1371), Limburgian founder of the Van Hoensbroeck family
Paul Hoen, American director and producer
Ragnar Hoen (1940-2019), Norwegian chess player
Steinar Hoen (born 1971), Norwegian high jumper
't Hoen
Ellen 't Hoen (born 1960), Dutch health researcher and humanitarian
Evert-Jan 't Hoen (born 1975), Dutch baseball player
Pieter 't Hoen (1744–1828), Dutch Patriot journalist
Van Hoen
Mark Van Hoen (born 1966), English musician

See also
Hōen, Japanese era (1135–1141)
Mechelse Hoen, Dutch name for the Malines chicken breed

Dutch-language surnames
Norwegian-language surnames